Solidago spectabilis is a species of goldenrod known by the common names Nevada goldenrod, basin goldenrod, and showy goldenrod. It is native to the western United States in the Great Basin and surrounding areas. It is found in California, Arizona, Nevada, Oregon, and Utah. There are historical records saying it once grew in southwestern Idaho, but is now extirpated there. This variety has also been seen in the western Montana county of Sanders.

Solidago spectabilis grows in moist habitat, including bogs, meadows, seeps, streambanks, hot springs, and wet areas on alkali flats. It is a rhizomatous perennial herb producing one or more erect stems that can reach two meters (5 feet) in maximum height. It is mostly hairless but can have occasional patches of rough hairs. There is a basal rosette of fleshy, lance-shaped leaves measuring up to 25 centimeters (10 inches), the blades borne on winged petioles. The edges may be wavy or slightly toothed. Leaves farther up the stem are smaller and usually smooth-edged. The inflorescence is a large erect or arching array of many flower heads, with some containing up to 100 heads. Each flower head contains 8-22 yellow disc florets surrounded 5-15 narrow yellow ray florets each no more than 4 millimeters long.

References

External links
Jepson Manual Treatment
Calphotos Photo gallery, University of California

spectabilis
Plants described in 1871
Flora of the Western United States
Flora without expected TNC conservation status